Margarita Karapanou (19 July 1946 – 2 December 2008) was a Greek novelist, most known for her first novel, Kassandra and the Wolf. Her novels have been translated into many languages.

Life and career
Margarita Karapanou was born in Athens, Greece, the daughter of novelist and dramatist Margarita Liberaki and Giorgos Karapanos, a lawyer and poet. Her parents divorced and her mother moved to Paris shortly after she was born. Karapanou grew up in both Athens, with her maternal grandmother, and with her mother in Paris. She studied philosophy and cinema in Paris, and nursery school teaching through distance education in London. In Paris, she was friends with Marie-France Ionesco, the daughter of Eugène Ionesco.

Karapanou worked as a nursery school teacher and also at a private kindergarten. She struggled with bipolar disorder throughout her life.

Kassandra and the Wolf was translated into English by Nikos C. Germanacos and published by Harcourt Brace in 1976 before it was published in Greece.

Her own translation of The Sleepwalker into French won the Prix du Meilleur livre étranger in 1988.

Her diaries, Η ζωή είναι αγρίως απίθανη: Ημερολόγια 1959-1979 (Life Is Wildly Improbable: Diaries 1959-1979), were published in November 2008, shortly before she died of respiratory problems on 2 December 2008.

Works
Novels
Η Κασσάνδρα και ο Λύκος [Hē Kassandra kai ho lykos] (Hermēs, 1977). Kassandra and the Wolf, trans. Nikos C. Germanacos (Harcourt Brace Jovanovich, 1976; Clockroot, 2009).
Ο υπνοβάτης [Ho hypnovatēs] (Hermēs, 1985). The Sleepwalker, trans. Karen Emmerich (Clockroot, 2011).
Rien ne va plus (Hermēs, 1991). Trans. Karen Emmerich (Clockroot, 2009).
Ναι [Nai] (Ōkeanida, 1999). Yes.
Lee και Lou [Lee kai Lou] (Ōkeanida, 2003). Lee and Lou.
Μαμά (Ōkeanida, 2004). Mama.
Other
Μήπως; [Mēpōs?] (Ōkeanida, 2006). Maybe? Conversations with psychologist and writer Fotini Tsalikoglou.
Η ζωή είναι αγρίως απίθανη [Ī zōī́ eínai agríōs apíthanī́] (Ōkeanida, 2008). Life Is Wildly Improbable: Diaries 1959-1979.
In anthologies
"The hour of the Wolf". In Rotter, P. (1975). Bitches & sad ladies: An anthology of fiction by and about women. New York: Harper's Magazine Press. 
"Word". in Biguenet, J. (1978). Foreign fictions: 25 contemporary stories from Canada, Europe, Latin America. New York: Vintage Books. 
"Kassandra" and "The Wolf". In Manguel, A. (1993). The gates of paradise: The anthology of erotic short fiction. New York: C. Potter. 
"Kalymnos". In Leontis, A. (1997). Greece: A traveler's literary companion. San Francisco, Calif: Whereabouts Press. 
"Island Melancholy" (2008). Mediterranean Passages: Readings from Dido to Derrida. University of North Carolina Press

Further reading

Friar, K. (1977). "Book Review: Kassandra and the Wolf". World Literature Today, 51(2), 316-317. (JSTOR Arts & Sciences V Collection)  
Bryfonski, D. (1980). Contemporary literary criticism: Volume 13. Detroit, Mich: Gale Research. 
Hohlfelder, C. A. (1997). Modes of expression and representation in modern Greek women's prose from 1938-1987. [Columbus] : Ohio State University. OCLC 38109068
Adamopoulos, A., & Karapanou, M. (introduction). (1999). Psémata páli. Athi̲na: Ekd. Agra. 

Bogdanou, C. (2004). Revisioning Cassandra: Defying daughters and master narratives in Florence Nightingale's "Cassandra" and Margarita Karapanou's Kassandra and the wolf. OCLC 54444553
Hembree, B. (2011). "Book Review: The Sleepwalker". World Literature Today, 85(4), 65-66. (JSTOR Current Scholarship Journals). 
Kotsovili, E. (2012). Giving an account of herself: Life-writing in Maro Douka, Rea Galanaki and Margarita Karapanou. University of Oxford & St. Cross College (University of Oxford). OCLC 863584651
Theodosatou, V. (2013). Aselēnois nyxi: G. Vizyēnos, M. Karapanou, G. Cheimōnas : treis psychanalytikes anagnōseis. Ασελήνοις νυξί : Γ. Βιζυηνός, Μ. Καραπάνου, Γ. Χειμωνάς : τρεις ψυχαναλυτικές αναγνώσεις. 
Nigianni, B. (2015). "Geographies of Affectivity in the Writings of Margarita Karapanou: Phenomenological and Psychoanalytic Interpretations". English Academy Review, 32(1), 96-108. doi: 10.1080/10131752.2015.1034948
Athanasiou-Krikelis, L. (2016). "Twisting the Story: Margarita Karapanou’s Rien ne va plus and Amanda Michalopoulou’s Θα ήθελα as Metaautobiographical Novels". Journal of Modern Greek Studies. doi: 10.1353/mgs.2016.0018

References

External links
Her page at the website of the Hellenic Authors' Society (Greek)
A page at the National Book Centre of Greece

1946 births
2008 deaths
Greek women novelists
20th-century novelists
20th-century women writers
20th-century Greek women writers